Victoria Station was a chain of railroad-themed steakhouse restaurants. At the peak of its popularity in the 1970s, the chain had 100 locations in the United States. The firm filed for bankruptcy in 1986. The last remaining restaurant in the former chain was located in Salem, Massachusetts until it abruptly closed in December 2017.

The restaurant chain continues in Malaysia.

History
The concept evolved from a Cornell University School of Hotel Administration graduate project, according to original owners Bob Freeman, Peter Lee, and Dick Bradley, all 1963 graduates of the school. The first location was opened in San Francisco in December 1969 and was a 158-seat restaurant located on the Embarcadero at Broadway that was constructed out of five boxcars and two cabooses around a central lobby-service area. Another source incorrectly claimed an April 1969 opening date. The restaurant was grossing $90,000 monthly during its first year of operations.

By the end of 1978, Victoria Station had 97 restaurants, all company owned.

The chain was designed to attract members of the baby boom generation. The theme of the restaurant was loosely based on London's Victoria Station. Antique English railway artifacts were used as decor inside, and the exteriors were composed of American Railway cars, primarily boxcars, with a signature Caboose placed in front. On the "entry platform" to each restaurant was a London-style phone booth. Prime rib was the featured item on a limited menu that included steaks, barbecued beef ribs, and shrimp done in a variation of scampi style known as "Shrimp Victoria". Most of the restaurants used authentic railway cars for dining areas, often boxcars or cabooses.

The Victoria Station chain flourished in the 1970s, according to a memoir by former Victoria Station corporate marketing manager Tom Blake. The company was among the first restaurant companies to offer its employees stock options and an ESOP program. The peak of success of the Victoria Station restaurant chain took place at the time of the culmination of a joint venture with Universal Studios, which resulted in the opening of Victoria Station Universal City, a location on the "hill" near where Citywalk now stands. At its peak, the Universal City location of Victoria Station was among the highest grossing restaurants in the United States. The coaches in the restaurant used four of the coaches from Flying Scotsman's tour of America. They were repainted and converted into dining cars.

The U.S. operations of the Victoria Station chain began running into financial difficulties in the mid-1980s, causing gradual shutdowns of the franchise restaurants. In May 1986, the company filed for Chapter 11 protection in the U.S. bankruptcy court. Eight months later, it was reported in January 1987 that the company had a restructuring plan in place that would require it to sell a number of restaurants.

A new company, called Victoria Station Acquisition Corporation and was controlled by Lowell Farkas, purchased the Victoria Station trademark and 11 of the restaurants for $6.5 million and the assumption of a $1 million tax liability.

There was a similar chain called "Twickenham Station" in Alabama and Florida during the same time span. They were not connected. (Huntsville AL, Montgomery AL, Mobile AL, Pensacola FL)

Promotions

Singer Johnny Cash produced a promotional album of train songs for the chain, titled Destination Victoria Station, which was then sold in the restaurants. This included the title song of the same name written and performed by Cash specifically for the album.

The chain was a sponsor of the United States Ski Team at least from 1977 to 1979 For several years, the Park City Ski Area (Mountain Resort) -- at which the US Olympic Ski team practices -- named one of its ski lifts Victoria Station.

Alfred Hitchcock flipped the railroad switch for the official opening of Victoria Station Universal City, on May 2, 1977. That restaurant included a funicular which carried patrons 600 feet up from the lower parking lot.

Known locations in the U.S. 

The following locations in the U.S. are known to have at one time housed a Victoria Station restaurant:
Albany, New York - Sand Creek Rd. (site is now Barnsider restaurant)
Amarillo, TX (now demolished)
Arlington, TX (now demolished)
Alexandria, VA (demolished - Public Storage now on site)
Altamonte Springs, FL (was on West SR 436, now demolished)
Atlanta, GA (there were at least three, all now demolished. One was near Cumberland Mall (2785 Cumberland Pkwy SE, Atlanta, GA 30339) one near Northlake Mall, and another on Piedmont, just south of Lindbergh)
Austin, TX (now houses a Longhorn Steakhouse)
Birmingham, AL (opened 1975 on Morris Avenue, now home to Kinetic Communications)
Bloomington, MN (now an Olive Garden restaurant)
Boston, MA (located near South Station, now demolished, old photo at )
Burlingame, CA (now Kincaid's Bayhouse)
Burlington, MA (128 Middlesex Turnpike. Location closed in 2005, building demolished; a Border Cafe is now on the site)
Casselberry, FL (on Fernwood Blvd)
Charlotte, NC
Maple Shade, NJ (was on Rte. 70, now demolished, site of an Audi dealership / Cherry Hill Imports)
Cincinnati, OH (the downtown and east locations are both demolished)
Columbus, OH</ref (was on Hwy 161, now demolished)
Columbia, MO (was at 402 E Broadway, Columbia, MO 65201, Building now Shiloh Bar & Grill) 
Darien, CT (building still standing, but the rail cars removed, now a Bertucci's)
Dallas/Fort Worth, TX
Glendale, CO (demolished)The Victoria Station restaurant was located in the parking lot of a Target store in Glendale CO a small suburb of Denver near the intersection of Alameda Ave and Leetsdale Drive (some sources say Alameda Ave and Colorado Blvd.)
East Brunswick, NJ (on Rt. 18 same lot as Brunswick Square Mall; now an Olive Garden restaurant. Rail cars were removed. No original structure remains. Unknown where rail cars went.
Fairfax, VA (demolished; CVS/pharmacy now on site; next door to an Outback Steakhouse)
Framingham, MA
Ft. Lauderdale, FL (corner of E. Cypress Creek (NE 62nd St.) & Dixie Hwy, demolished, unknown disposition of caboose & boxcars)
Gaithersburg, MD (now a Bugaboo Creek Steakhouse; burned March 10, 2005/reopened February, 2006)
Golden, CO
Honolulu, HI (on Kapiolani Blvd. in Waikiki; demolished)
Houston, TX (now a Droubi's Imports)
Indianapolis, IN (opened 1973 @ 7279 N.Keystone Ave, demolished 1988)
Jacksonville, FL (demolished, date unknown)
Kansas City, MO 2 locations, 103rd & Wornall and River Market area. 103rd became Spaghetti Factory, but demolished and now car dealership.
King of Prussia, PA (later became "Bonkers" then Rib It and then eventually demolished. McDonald's now stands on this site.)
Knoxville, TN
Larkspur, California (a/k/a Victoria Station Marin County)
Latham, NY
Los Angeles, CA (including one in Hollywood; see Universal City below)
Louisville, KY
Macon, GA (Macon Mall)
Marin, CA (located in Larkspur) (demolished, date unknown)
Maumee, OH structure still there, converted to Fricker's restaurant, box cars and caboose are externally covered but can still be seen for inside
Memphis, TN (demolished; was located near the intersection of Mendenhall and Mt. Moriah).
Miami, FL (2 locations first one in Miami on NW 36th Street just north of the airport & 64th Avenue (demolished in 1994) property for sale and inside the Dadeland Mall, demolished in the early 1990s, now a Victoria's Secret)
Monroeville, Pennsylvania (demolished; Land now used by Petco)
New Orleans, LA
Newport Beach, CA (corner of Macarthur and Jamboree)
Niles, IL (now a Russian restaurant called "Moscow Nights")
North Miami Beach, FL
Northbrook, IL (across from Peacock Palace and Holiday Inn, site now a National Pride self car wash)
Northridge, CA
Oakland, California (closed. Once a part of the former Jack London Village. Building still stands in 2019, complete with boxcars and caboose. Now part of "Embarcadero Cove Marine," adjacent to the SF Bay Trail.)
Orange Village, Ohio (located on Orange Place near Interstate 271; now demolished - another structure now occupies the site)
Philadelphia, PA (demolished)
Pittsburgh, PA
Phoenix, AZ
Plantation Gardens, Hawaii (Kauai)
Portland, OR (at SW Macadam and Nebraska, demolished, caboose saved and relocated near Hillsboro Airport) Opened in 1973, restaurant number 14; closed in 1986 with bankruptcy of the chain. A Mount Hood chairlift named Victoria Station was associated with the restaurant's opening: the chair was in service from 1966 through 2000 (when it was upgraded and renamed Molly's Express).
Quinn's Lighthouse
Reno, NV (now an Olive Garden restaurant)
Richmond, VA (currently the home of Brick Road Coffee Company).
Rocky River, OH
Roseville, California (closed, but bldgs remain as of January 2008)
Roseville, MN
Sacramento, CA
Salem, Massachusetts (closed December 2017; future site Finz Restaurant)
Salt Lake City, UT
San Antonio, TX
San Diego, CA (train cars moved to another city, location now a Del Taco, next door to In Cahoots, formerly Confetti's)
San Francisco, CA (original location, demolished after the quake of 1989)
Schaumburg, IL
Seattle, WA (became a Thai restaurant on Eastlake Ave.)
Southfield, MI (later became "Bonkers" then eventually demolished)
St. Louis, MO
Sunnyvale, CA 855 East Homestead Rd- partially disguised dining and caboose car still visible from the street. (Google street view) (was a Vietnamese soup restaurant now permanently closed)
Tahoe City, CA
Tampa, FL
Torrance, CA (previously incorrectly listed as demolished-as of April 2007 location operating as the South Bay Grill, 23805 Hawthorne Bl, Torrance CA 90505. Boxcars and caboose are intact with building) (demolished as of mid 2010)
Troy, MI (on Big Beaver Road)
Tulsa, OK (decorative train water tower still standing in 2018)
Universal City, CA
Virginia Gardens, Florida
Villa Park, CA
Villa Park, IL
Virginia Beach, VA
Wauwatosa, WI
Wayne, NJ (now a market research facility)
West Covina, CA
Westminster, CA (Orange County)
West Palm Beach, FL (located on Palm Beach Lakes Blvd @ I-95 (demolished, now Olive Garden)
Whippany, NJ (demolished, now site of a CVS)
White Plains, NY
Willow Grove, PA (later Boston Sea Party, directly adjacent to Pennsylvania Turnpike interchange, formerly Exit 27, now Exit 343. Demolished, now site of Courtyard by Marriott
Woodmere, OH (rail car on Orange Place, which runs parallel to I-271. Restaurant and car no longer there)
Woodland Hills, CA (later became "Bonkers" then eventually demolished)
Yonkers, NY, (boxcars are offices for a Sanitation Company. As of 2018, it appears to be demolished).

Worldwide Locations 
Montreal, Quebec, Canada (demolished)
Malaysia
Tokyo, Japan (still running under the name Victoria Station)
Toronto, Ontario, Canada (demolished)
Vancouver, British Columbia, Canada (now closed)
Yokohama, Japan (now closed)
Osaka, Japan (now closed)
Kobe, Japan (named "Central Station" which was Victoria Station's chain, now closed)
Paris, France
Sapporo, Japan- complete with Big Boy statues

International
In 1979, Daiei and Wendy's International formed a joint company called Wenco Japan Inc. that operated Victoria Station franchise steak houses and Wendy's fast-food restaurants in Japan. In 2002, Daiei sold Wenco Japan, which included the Victoria Station franchised restaurants, to Zensho for 4.60 billion yen. The brand continues to be operated in Japan under the Zensho firm.

See also
 List of steakhouses
 Pacific Dining Car

References

Further reading
Victoria Station is still working on its restructuring. March 19, 1986 - Los Angeles Times (re: Victoria Station at Larkspur Landing in California).

External links
Prime Rib and Boxcars: Whatever Happened to Victoria Station? history of the chain.
1981 newspaper ad for the Seattle Victoria Station location.
Zensho's Victoria Station website (in Japanese)

Regional restaurant chains in the United States
Defunct restaurant chains in the United States
Steakhouses in the United States
Companies that filed for Chapter 11 bankruptcy in 1986
Railway-themed restaurants